Ladywell Leisure Centre was a leisure centre located in Lewisham, London. The leisure centre was owned by London Borough of Lewisham and managed on their behalf by Lifestyle Fusion. The building was demolished in 2014, as a result of the new Glass Mill Leisure Centre being opened.

The building featured as the main character's workplace in Sean Lock's sitcom 15 Storeys High.

See also

Forest Hill Pools

References

External links
Fusion Lifestyle- Lewisham Leisure Centres
Lewisham Council - Ladywell Leisure Centre

Sports venues in London
Sport in the London Borough of Lewisham
Swimming venues in London
Demolished buildings and structures in London
Buildings and structures demolished in 2014